Bridgewater Place is the first phase of a two-building construction in Downtown Grand Rapids, Michigan. It is currently the fourth tallest building in the city. The second phase was River House Condominiums, which is the tallest building in Grand Rapids. Bridgewater Place is a class A office building with its own parking garage. The building has 2 lobby floors with some minor offices, 15 office floors, and a small mechanical floor at the top totaling 18 floors. The two buildings share a 7-story above-ground parking garage.

See also 
 List of tallest buildings in Grand Rapids

References

External links
Image of the buildings

Skyscrapers in Grand Rapids, Michigan
Skyscraper office buildings in Michigan
Office buildings completed in 1993
1993 establishments in Michigan